A list of films produced in South Korea in 1961:

External links
1961 in South Korea

 1960-1969 at koreanfilm.org

South Korea
1961
Films